Armando Pontone (born 3 July 1992 in Pontecorvo) is an Italian motorcycle racer. He has competed in the 125cc World Championship, the Moto3 World Championship, the Supersport 300 World Championship and the Supersport World Championship. He won the Italian Honda NSF250R Trophy in 2014.

Career statistics

Grand Prix motorcycle racing

By season

Races by year
(key) (Races in bold indicate pole position; races in italics indicate fastest lap)

Supersport World Championship

Races by year
(key) (Races in bold indicate pole position; races in italics indicate fastest lap)

References

External links
 

Living people
1992 births
Italian motorcycle racers
125cc World Championship riders
Moto3 World Championship riders
Sportspeople from the Province of Frosinone
Supersport 300 World Championship riders
Supersport World Championship riders